The O. Henry Award is an annual American award given to short stories of exceptional merit. The award is named after the American short-story writer O. Henry.

The PEN/O. Henry Prize Stories is an annual collection of the year's twenty best stories published in U.S. and Canadian magazines.

Until 2002 there were first, second, and third prize winners and from 2003–2019 there were three jurors who each selected a short story of special interest or merit; the collection is called The PEN/O. Henry Prize Stories, and the original collection was called Prize Stories 1919: The O. Henry Memorial Awards.

History and format
The award was first presented in 1919 and funded by the Society of Arts and Sciences. As of 2021, the guest editor chooses twenty short stories, each an O. Henry Prize story. All stories published in an American or Canadian periodical are eligible for consideration, including stories that have been translated into English.

The goal of The O. Henry Prize Stories remains to strengthen the art of the short story.

The current series editor for The O. Henry Prize Stories is Jenny Minton Quigley. Past series editors have been: Blanche Colton Williams (1919–32), Harry Hansen (1933–40), Herschel Brickell (1941–51), Paul Engle (1954–59), Mary Stegner (1960), Richard Poirier (1961–66, assisted by William S. Abrahams, 1964–66), William Abrahams (1967–96), Larry Dark (1997–2002) and Laura Furman (2003–2019). There were no volumes of the series in 1952 and 1953 (due to Herschel Brickell's death), 2004 and 2020.

Partnership with PEN American Center
In 2009 The O. Henry Prize Stories publisher, Anchor Books, renamed the series in partnership with the PEN American Center (today PEN America), producing the first PEN/O. Henry Prize Stories collection. Proceeds from the PEN/O. Henry Prize Stories 2009 would be directed to PEN's Readers & Writers Program, which sends well-known authors to under served inner-city schools. 

The selection included stories by Graham Joyce, John Burnside, Roger Nash, Manuel Muñoz, Ha Jin, Paul Theroux, Judy Troy, Nadine Gordimer, Marisa Silver, Paul Yoon, Andrew Sean Greer, and Junot Díaz, with A. S. Byatt, Tim O'Brien and Anthony Doerr – all authors of past O. Henry Prize Stories – serving as the prize jury.

In an interview for the Vintage Books and Anchor Books blog, editor Laura Furman called the collaboration with PEN a "natural partnership."

First-prize winners (1919–2002)

Juror favorites (2003–2019)

Guest editor (2021–)

See also 
 The Best American Short Stories

References

External links
 
 O. Henry Prize, PEN Announce Partnership
 2009 PEN/O. Henry Prize Stories
 Three-time winners
 Past winners (by author, 1919–2017) at Random House (via Archive.org)
 Past winners (by date, 1919–1999) at Random House's Bold Type (via Archive.org)
 Compilations by year

PEN America awards
Awards established in 1919
1919 establishments in the United States

Short story awards